Fullscreen (or full screen) refers to the 4:3 (1.:1) aspect ratio of early standard television screens and computer monitors. Widescreen ratios started to become more popular in the 1990s and 2000s. 

Film originally created in the 4:3 aspect ratio does not need to be altered for full screen release, while other aspect ratios can be converted to full screen using techniques such as pan and scan, open matte or reframing. In pan and scan, the 4:3 image is extracted from within the original frame by cropping the sides of the film. In open matte, the 4:3 image is extracted from parts of the original negative which were shot but not intended to be used for the theatrical release. In reframing, elements within the image are repositioned. Reframing is almost exclusively a method used for entirely CG movies, where the elements can be easily moved.

History
Full screen aspect ratios in standard television have been in use since the invention of moving picture cameras. Early computer monitors employed the same aspect ratio. The aspect ratio 4:3 was used for 35 mm films in the silent era. It is also very close to the 1.375:1 Academy ratio, defined by the Academy of Motion Picture Arts and Sciences as a standard after the advent of optical sound-on-film. By having TV match this aspect ratio, movies originally photographed on 35 mm film could be satisfactorily viewed on TV in the early days of television (i.e. the 1940s and the 1950s). When cinema attendance dropped, Hollywood created widescreen aspect ratios (such as the 1.85:1 ratio mentioned earlier) in order to differentiate the film industry from TV. However, at the start of the 21st century, broadcasters worldwide began phasing out the 4:3 standard entirely as manufacturers started to favor the 16:9 aspect ratio of all modern high-definition television sets, broadcast cameras and computer monitors, and certain tablet computers uses the 4:3 aspect ratio.

See also
 Aspect ratio (image)

References

Film and video technology
Picture aspect ratios